Girls in Pants: The Third Summer of the Sisterhood (also known as Girls in Pants) is the third in a series of five books The Sisterhood of the Traveling Pants (2001), The Second Summer of the Sisterhood (2003), Forever in Blue (2007), and Sisterhood Everlasting.

The novel was one of three in the series adapted into a film The Sisterhood of the Traveling Pants 2 (2008).

Plot summary 
It is the girls' last summer before college. They all find themselves in different, but challenging situations. They all struggle with their identities, love, and relationships.

Lena 
Following the death of Lena's grandfather, Lena's father convinced his mother, Valia, to move in with his family. Valia is homesick and sad, and, as a result, constantly complains and makes Lena's home life very tense (in addition to the recent loss of her past lover, Kostos). Lena's one solace is the figure drawing class she is taking at an art school, despite her parents' wishes that she choose a more practical interest. However, when her father comes into the class and sees her drawing a nude model, he forbids her from taking the class. Lena tries to fund the class herself but is caught by her father, who then announces that he will not pay for Lena to go to the Rhode Island School of Design.

Shocked by her father's decision, Lena goes to the class's instructor, Annik Marchand, who advises Lena to try for a scholarship. Lena makes a portfolio of drawings of her family, as well as Paul Rodman, who comes to stay with Carmen and ends up visiting and posing for Lena. Through her drawings, Lena learns more about her family: her sister Effie's anger that Lena is leaving for college, her mother's struggle between Lena's wishes and her father's, her father's fear of Lena entering a world he is unfamiliar with, and her grandmother's wishes that someone pay attention to her misery instead of simply ignoring it.

At the end of the summer, Lena mails in her portfolio and receives word that she has gotten the scholarship. She tells her father and receives his permission to attend art school. She also manages to convince him to allow Valia to return to Greece.

Tibby 
Brian asks Tibby to go to the senior party with him, as his date. At first, she refuses to think of him as anything but a friend but eventually discovers that she, too has developed feelings for him. Although after some time it is clear that the feeling is mutual, she worries about changing their relationship and opening herself up to him. She soon relents, though, and Brian kisses her and tells her that he loves her. The next morning, Katherine reached out the window to get an apple but falls out the window and injures her head. Tibby is thrown into depression, concerned for Katherine and blaming herself for the accident. She also feels as if she didn't love Katherine enough, having always resented her younger siblings. She begins to avoid Brian, feeling that the accident wouldn't have happened if she hadn't been thinking about him, and also believing that Katherine's accident indicates that taking chances will only end in suffering. Towards the end of the novel, Tibby becomes Christina's unwilling labor partner and helps Christina be brave enough to have the baby, even without her husband and Carmen's presence. This encourages Tibby to be brave herself and confront her feelings for Brian instead of shying away from them, and they begin a relationship.

Bridget 
Bridget goes to soccer camp in Pennsylvania and is shocked to discover that one of her fellow coaches is none other than Eric. She finds her feelings for him reawakening but is stunned by the discovery that he has a girlfriend, Kaya. Bridget plans to begin avoiding Eric, but her plan is shot down when she and Eric are made partners, causing them to see each other constantly.

Not wanting to upset Eric, Bridget selflessly puts her feelings aside and restrains herself to being Eric’s friend while respecting the relationship between Eric and Kaya. The two develop a friendship despite Bridget’s uncertainties.

Later, Bridget comes down with a fever, and Eric finds her in her cabin very ill. Eric carries her to his cabin and he takes care of her. They fall asleep together, and Bridget wakes up to find Eric holding her. Feeling guilty, she tries to break the hold quietly, but her attempts to wake up Eric. Bridget feels confused and betrayed when he leaves the camp for an unknown reason and decides that she won’t continue to vie for his attention anymore. As much as she prided herself on making this summer with Eric different from the first one (where she threw herself at him and they ended up having sex), it begins to feel the same because once again she is left wondering why he left her. She trains her soccer team hard, and they go on to defeat Eric’s in the championship.

Bridget later questions Eric about his leaving, and Eric reveals that he returned to New York to break up with his girlfriend due to his feelings for Bridget. At first, Bridget asks Eric if he gets closer to her just to leave her, but he lets her know otherwise. He tells her that he thinks they were always meant to be. They become closer than they were before and agree to become a couple because it was fate that brought them together and the only thing that can tear them apart is each other. They are in love.
Even though she is in love, she will always make sure she has time for her friends.

Carmen 
Carmen feels stressed out over her mother’s pregnancy and her job watching Lena’s grandmother, Valia, who has become cranky and sullen ever since she was forced to move to the United States following the death of her husband. Carmen also begins to feel that her leaving for college will leave her unable to return home, and decides to attend the University of Maryland instead of Williams so that she can stay home and retain a part of her old life.

While taking Valia to the hospital one day, Carmen meets a guy named Win Sawyer, a college student who volunteers at the hospital. He begins to develop feelings for her, and she for him, but she fears that he only likes her because he assumes that she is a kind and selfless person, and is afraid of telling him the truth. She calls this selfless side of her, "Good Carmen."

When Carmen’s mother goes into labor four weeks early, Carmen enlists Tibby to stay with her mother, and together with Win Sawyer heads off to find David, Christina's husband, who is out of town.  Together, Tibby and Christina do it and she delivers a baby boy which Carmen names Ryan. After the baby is born, Win and Carmen finally kiss and leave the hospital hand in hand. Carmen finds that "Good Carmen," is a part of her, not a different person. Carmen realizes that there will always be a place for her in her family, and she decides to go to Williams College. She is very sad to be going separate ways for college but is also excited to finally attend the college of her wishes.

2005 American novels
American novels adapted into films
Delacorte Press books